Protein Local Optimization Program (PLOP) is computer software, a molecular dynamics simulation package written in the programming language Fortran. It was developed originally by Matthew P. Jacobson and Richard A. Friesner of the Friesner lab at Columbia University, and then moved to the Jacobson lab at University of California, San Francisco (UCSF), and Schrödinger, LLC.

See also 
 Comparison of software for molecular mechanics modeling

References

External links 
  wiki

Computational chemistry
Fortran software
Molecular dynamics